Acanthostigma septoconstrictum is a species of fungus in the Tubeufiaceae family of fungi. It was isolated from decomposing wood in the Great Smoky Mountains National Park. A. septoconstrictum differs from its cogenerate species by having longer setae and asci and broader, asymmetrical ascospores which are constricted at their septa.

References

Further reading

Sanchez, Romina Magalí, Andrew N. Miller, and Maria Virginia Bianchinotti. "A new species of Acanthostigma (Tubeufiaceae, Dothideomycetes) from the southern hemisphere." Mycologia 104.1 (2012): 223–231.
Boonmee, Saranyaphat, et al. "Revision of lignicolous Tubeufiaceae based on morphological reexamination and phylogenetic analysis." Fungal Diversity 51.1 (2011): 63–102.

External links

MycoBank

Tubeufiaceae